Estevan is a provincial electoral district for the Legislative Assembly of Saskatchewan, Canada.

The city of Estevan (pop. 10,084) is the largest centre in the constituency. Known as Saskatchewan's "Energy City", the area has rich deposits of oil, natural gas, and lignite coal. Provincial Highways 39 and 47 connect Estevan with the American state of North Dakota.

Smaller centres in the riding include the towns of Bienfait, Midale and Radville; and the villages of North Portal, Goodwater, Macoun, Oungre, Halbrite, Torquay and Lake Alma.

Members of the Legislative Assembly

Election results

|-

|NDP
|Blair Schoenfeld
|align="right"|1,045
|align="right"|17.27
|align="right"|-1.52

|- bgcolor="white"
!align="left" colspan=3|Total
!align="right"|6,052
!align="right"|100.00
!align="right"|

|-

|NDP
|Morris Johnson
|align="right"|1,335
|align="right"|18.79
|align="right"|-12.60

|Liberal
|Tim Seipp
|align="right"|910
|align="right"|12.81
|align="right"|-3.15

|- bgcolor="white"
!align="left" colspan=3|Total
!align="right"|7,106
!align="right"|100.00
!align="right"|

|-

|NDP
|David Pattyson
|align="right"|2,154
|align="right"|31.39
|align="right"|+11.94

|Liberal
|Tim Seipp
|align="right"|1,095
|align="right"|15.96
|align="right"|-16.01

|- bgcolor="white"
!align="left" colspan=3|Total
!align="right"|6,862
!align="right"|100.00
!align="right"|

|-

|Liberal
|Neil Collins
|align="right"|2,440
|align="right"|31.97
|align="right"|-0.50

|NDP
|Larry Ward
|align="right"|1,484
|align="right"|19.45
|align="right"|-16.16

|- bgcolor="white"
!align="left" colspan=3|Total
!align="right"|7,631
!align="right"|100.00
!align="right"|

|-

| style="width: 130px" |NDP
|Larry Ward
|align="right"|2,641
|align="right"|35.61
|align="right"|–

|Liberal
|Austin Gerein
|align="right"|2,408
|align="right"|32.47
|align="right"|–

|Prog. Conservative
|David Davis
|align="right"|2,367
|align="right"|31.92
|align="right"|–
|- bgcolor="white"
!align="left" colspan=3|Total
!align="right"|7,416
!align="right"|100.00
!align="right"|

References

External links
Website of the Legislative Assembly of Saskatchewan
Saskatchewan Archives Board – Saskatchewan Election Results By Electoral Division

Estevan
Saskatchewan provincial electoral districts